Florida Grove is a ghost town in Morrow County, in the U.S. state of Ohio.

History
Florida Grove was founded before 1823. By the 1880s, the town site had reverted to farmland.

References

Geography of Morrow County, Ohio
Ghost towns in Ohio